Lyndon Sheehan (born 16 July 1988) is a New Zealand freestyle skier. He competed at the FIS Freestyle World Ski Championships 2013 in Voss, and at the 2014 Winter Olympics in Sochi, in men's halfpipe.

References 

1988 births
Living people
Freestyle skiers at the 2014 Winter Olympics
New Zealand male freestyle skiers
Olympic freestyle skiers of New Zealand